Ahtaj is a town in Afghanistan.

See also
 Parwan Province

References 

Populated places in Parwan Province